Alan II, Earl of Menteith (d. after 23 Aug 1315) was a Scottish Nobleman.

Life
Menteith was the son of Alan, Earl of Menteith, and is first noted in an order dated at Carlisle in 1307 to provide foodstuffs ' to the two sons of the Earl of Menteith, and the son of the Earl of Stratherne'.  He evidently was an English prisoner, but he either escaped to the Scottish camp or was exchanged for an English nobleman held by the Scots.  'Alan, son of Earl Alan of Menteith' was the beneficiary of the entail by his cousin Duncan of the Earldom of Fife in the event of the failure of lawful heirs in an agreement dated at Crichton, 23 August 1315.  He died some time before 1 August 1323, on which date his uncle Muireadhach III witnessed a charter as Earl of Menteith.

Marriage and issue
Alan II, Earl of Menteith married an unknown lady, by whom he had a daughter Mary II, Countess of Menteith.

Notes

References
Balfour Paul, Sir James Scots Peerage IX vols. Edinburgh 1904.
Joseph Bain, Calendar of Documents Relating to Scotland, 1272-1307.  Edinburgh, 1884 (Vol. II)

Mormaers of Menteith
14th-century Scottish earls